Železničná spoločnosť Slovensko, a.s. (ZSSK) is a Slovak state-owned passenger train company based in Bratislava.

In 2002 a company Železničná spoločnosť was established as a successor of personal and cargo transport part of the Železnice Slovenskej republiky. In 2005 this new company was further split into "Železničná spoločnosť Slovensko, a. s." providing Passenger transport services and "Železničná spoločnosť Cargo Slovakia, a. s." (ZSSK CARGO or ZSCS) providing cargo services.

References

Railway companies of Slovakia
Slovak brands